Bodi is one of the constituencies represented in the Parliament of Ghana. It elects one Member of Parliament (MP) by the first past the post system of election. Bodi is located in the Bodi District of the Western North Region of Ghana. Sampson Ahi has remained the only member of Parliament ever since the constituency was formed.

Members of Parliament

References 

Parliamentary constituencies in the Western North Region